Seeon-Seebruck is a municipality in the district of Traunstein in southern Bavaria in Germany.

Municipal districts
 Seeon 6 km north of Lake Chiemsee within the Seeon Lakes.
 Seebruck is a popular local tourist spot in the north end of Lake Chiemsee where the river Alz origins. The town is a popular base for sailing activities.
 Truchtlaching 5 km east of Seebruck on the Alz river.

References

Traunstein (district)